Paradeplatz is a square on Bahnhofstrasse in downtown Zürich, Switzerland. It is one of the most expensive pieces of real estate in Switzerland and has become synonymous with wealth and the Swiss banks, being the location of the headquarters of both UBS and Credit Suisse. It is surrounded by four blocks of buildings.

The site of the square lay without the medieval city walls, and was incorporated into the town with the construction of the new ramparts in 1642. During the 17th century, it served as a livestock market, known as Säumärt ("pig market"), renamed to Neumarkt ("new market") in 1819 and finally to its current name following the construction of Bahnhofstrasse (1865).

Paradeplatz is one of the main nodal points of the Zürich tram network, and the stop is served by lines 2, 6, 7, 8, 9, 11, 13 and 17.

Paradeplatz was the scene of clashes between insurgents and cantonal troops during the 1839 Züriputsch. 

The first horse-drawn trams circulated in 1882 and were electrified in 1896.

Constituent buildings
In the block to the north, which is bounded by Talacker to the west, Bahnhofstrasse to the east and Paradeplatz to the south, is the home of Credit Suisse, amongst other businesses. The building, formerly known as the Kreditanstalt building, dates to 1873. The Lichthof shopping mall is at the eastern corner of the building.

The hotel Baur en Ville, on the eastern end of the square, opened in 1838. Also in this block is the Blancpain watch store and the Harry Winston jewellery store. This block is bounded by Züghusplatz to the north and Poststrasse to the south.

The Confiserie Sprüngli, in the southern block, opened in 1859. It is bounded by Paradeplatz to the north, Bahnhofstrasse to the east and Bleicherweg to the west.

The UBS (formerly Bankverein) building on the western side dates to 1897–99. It is bounded by Talacker to the north, Paradeplatz to the east and Bleicherweg to the south.

Panoramic view

Gallery

References

External links

Squares in Zürich
Altstadt (Zürich)
Financial districts